Chuanying District is a district of Jilin City, Jilin, People's Republic of China.

Administrative divisions
Subdistricts:
Dadong Subdistrict, Nanjing Subdistrict, Xiangyang Subdistrict, Qingdao Subdistrict, Henan Subdistrict, Beiji Subdistrict, Zhihe Subdistrict, Desheng Subdistrict, Linjiang Subdistrict, Changchun Road Subdistrict, Huangqitun Subdistrict, Beishan Subdistrict

Townships:
Huanxi Township, Shahezi Township

References

External links

Jilin City
County-level divisions of Jilin